is a Japanese politician of the Liberal Democratic Party, a member of the House of Representatives in the Diet (national legislature) and a former Minister of Economic Planning. A native of Utsunomiya, Tochigi he attended Keio University both as undergraduate and graduate. He was elected to the House of Representatives for the first time in 1979.

Family
Motoda Hajime (his great-grandfather) 
Naka Funada (his grandfather) 
Kyoji Funada (his great-uncle)
Sensuke Fujieda (his great-uncle)
Yuzuru Funada (his father)
Kei Funada (his wife)

Political positions
parliamentary vice-minister of education
parliamentary vice-minister of Public Management, Home Affairs, Posts and Telecommunications
Director General of the Economic Planning Agency
Acting Chairman, Headquarters for the Promotion of Revision to the Constitution

Political affiliations
Funada is affiliated to the following right wing groups in the Diet:
Diet Member Alliance for Enacting a New Constitution (新憲法制定議員同盟 – Shinkenpou seitei giin doumei)
Conference of parliamentarians on the Shinto Association of Spiritual Leadership (神道政治連盟国会議員懇談会 - Shinto Seiji Renmei Kokkai Giin Kondankai) - NB: SAS a.k.a. Sinseiren, Shinto Political League

References 
LDP website: Funada Hajime: jimin.jp/english/profile/members/120805.html (retrieved 20150205)

External links 
  in Japanese.

Living people
1953 births
People from Utsunomiya, Tochigi
Keio University alumni
Members of the House of Representatives (Japan)
Economic planning ministers of Japan
Liberal Democratic Party (Japan) politicians
21st-century Japanese politicians